Twin Earths is an American science fiction comic strip written by Oskar Lebeck and drawn by Alden McWilliams that ran in Sunday and daily newspapers from 1952 until 1963. The strip was distributed by United Feature Syndicate.

Publication history 
The daily strip began on June 16, 1952, the Sunday on March 1, 1953. The Sunday was drawn in a half page format, but it was available in smaller formats with dropped panels.

While semi-retired, Lebeck teamed with McWilliams (who had illustrated some of Lebeck's past books and had done work for him at Dell Comics) to launch Twin Earths. It made use of the duplicate earth concept and tapped into the growing interest during the period in flying saucers. In 1957, Lebeck retired and McWilliams assumed scripting duties for the strip.

The Twin Earths Sunday strip ended December 28, 1958, while the daily strip continued until May 25, 1963.

Characters and story
The story told of another Earth (called Terra), in the same orbit as our planet but on the opposite side of the sun, whose scientifically advanced civilization visits us in flying saucers. Comics historian Stephen Donnelly noted:

Reprints
Most of the strips have been reprinted in magazine format. In 1987, Dragon Lady Press published one issue of Science Fiction Classics featuring Twin Earths. Beginning in 1991, R. Susor Publications reprinted most of the daily and Sunday strips in three magazines, Twin Earths (eight issues), Twin Earths Sunday Pages (five issues), and Twin Earths Special Edition (one issue)

See also
List of Twin Earths comic strips

References

Sources
Twin Earths Special Edition #1, R. Susor Publications, 1993.

1952 comics debuts
1963 comics endings
American comic strips
Counter-Earths
Science fiction comic strips